Holcopogon tucki is a moth in the family Autostichidae. It was described by Vives Moreno in 1999. It is found in South Africa.

References

Endemic moths of South Africa
Moths described in 1999
Holcopogon